Dorothy Jean Dandridge (November 9, 1922 – September 8, 1965) was an American actress, singer and dancer. She is the first African-American film star to be nominated for the Academy Award for Best Actress, which was for her performance in Carmen Jones (1954). Dandridge also performed as a vocalist in venues such as the Cotton Club and the Apollo Theater. During her early career, she performed as a part of The Wonder Children, later The Dandridge Sisters, and appeared in a succession of films, usually in uncredited roles.

In 1959, Dandridge was nominated for a Golden Globe Award for Porgy and Bess. She is the subject of the 1999 HBO biographical film, Introducing Dorothy Dandridge. She has been recognized with a star on the Hollywood Walk of Fame.

Dandridge was married and divorced twice, first to dancer Harold Nicholas (the father of her daughter, Harolyn Suzanne) and then to hotel owner Jack Denison. Dandridge died in 1965 at the age of 42.

Early life 
Dandridge was born in 1922 in Cleveland, Ohio, to entertainer Ruby Dandridge (née Butler) and Cyril Dandridge. Her father was a cabinetmaker and Baptist minister. Her parents separated just before her birth.

Ruby created a song-and-dance act for her two young daughters, Vivian and Dorothy, under the name The Wonder Children. The act was managed by her lover, Geneva Williams. Williams was said to have had a bad temper and to have cruelly disciplined the children. The sisters toured the Southern United States almost nonstop for five years (rarely attending school), while Ruby worked and performed in Cleveland.

During the Great Depression, work virtually dried up for the Dandridges, as it did for many Chitlin' Circuit performers. Ruby moved her family to Hollywood, California, where she found steady work on radio and film in small domestic-servant parts. After that relocation, in 1930, Dorothy attended McKinley Junior High School.

The Wonder Children were renamed The Dandridge Sisters in 1934. Dandridge and her sister were teamed with dance schoolmate Etta Jones.

Career

Beginnings 
The Dandridge Sisters continued strong for several years, and were booked in several high-profile New York nightclubs, including the Cotton Club and the Apollo Theater. Dandridge first appeared on screen at the age of 13 in a small part in an Our Gang comedy short, "Teacher's Beau" in 1935. As a part of The Dandridge Sisters, she also appeared in The Big Broadcast of 1936 (1936) with Bill "Bojangles" Robinson, A Day at the Races with the Marx Brothers, and It Can't Last Forever (both 1937) with the Jackson Brothers. Although these appearances were relatively minor, Dandridge continued to earn recognition through continuing her nightclub performances nationwide.

Dandridge's first credited film role was in Four Shall Die (1940). The race film cast her as a murderer and did little for her film career. Because of her rejection of stereotypical black roles, she had limited options for film roles. She had small roles in Lady from Louisiana with John Wayne and Sundown with Gene Tierney, both in 1941.

Also that year, Dandridge appeared as part of a Specialty Number, "Chattanooga Choo Choo", in the hit 1941 musical Sun Valley Serenade for 20th Century Fox. The film marked the first time she performed with the Nicholas Brothers. Aside from her film appearances, Dandridge appeared in a succession of "soundies" – film clips that were displayed on jukeboxes, including "Paper Doll" by the Mills Brothers, "Cow, Cow Boogie", "Jig in the Jungle", and "Mr. and Mrs. Carpenter's Rent Party" also called "Swing for my Supper", among others. These films were noted not only for showcasing Dandridge as singer and dancer and her acting abilities, but also for featuring a strong emphasis on her physical attributes.

She continued to appear occasionally in films and on the stage throughout the rest of the 1940s, while also  performing as a band singer in films with some good company: Count Basie in Hit Parade of 1943 and Louis Armstrong, Atlantic City (1944) and Pillow to Post (1945). In 1944, Dandridge was featured as the star in "Sweet 'N Hot" a musical held at the Mayan theatre in Los Angeles which was the produced by Leon Hefflin Sr. and played nightly for eleven weeks. In 1951, Dandridge appeared as Melmendi, Queen of the Ashuba in Tarzan's Peril, starring Lex Barker and Virginia Huston. When the Motion Picture Production Code objected to the film's "blunt sexuality", Dandridge received considerable attention for wearing what was considered "provocatively revealing" clothing. The continuing publicity buzz surrounding Dandridge's wardrobe got her featured on the April 1951 cover of Ebony. That same year, she had a supporting role in The Harlem Globetrotters (1951).

In May 1951, Dandridge had a spectacular opening at the Mocambo nightclub in West Hollywood after assiduous coaching and decisions on style with pianist Phil Moore. This success seemed a new turn to her career, and she appeared in New York and at Café de Paris in London with equal success. In a return engagement at the Mocambo in December 1952, a Metro-Goldwyn-Mayer studio agent saw Dandridge and recommended to production chief Dore Schary that she might make an appearance as a club singer, in her own name, in Remains to Be Seen, a film already in production. Her acquaintance with Dore Schary resulted in his casting Dandridge as Jane Richards in Bright Road—her first starring role, in which she expressed herself as a "wonderful, emotional actress"—which the trailer was to later promote. The film, which centered on a teacher's struggles to reach out to a troubled student, marked the first time Dandridge appeared in a film opposite Harry Belafonte. She continued her performances in nightclubs and appeared on multiple early television variety shows, including Ed Sullivan's Toast of the Town.

Carmen Jones and 20th Century-Fox 
In 1953, a nationwide talent search was conducted as 20th Century Fox began the process of casting an all-black musical film adaptation of Oscar Hammerstein II's 1943 Broadway musical Carmen Jones. This production had updated Georges Bizet's opera Carmen to a World War II-era African-American setting. Director and writer Otto Preminger found Dandridge's starring role from the previous year in Bright Road underwhelming, and that she would be better suited for the smaller role of the quiet Cindy Lou in Carmen Jones (1954). Dandridge, who had dressed down for the screen test of 'Bright Road' to suit the demure school teacher at its center, worked with Max Factor make-up artists convey the look and character of the earthy Carmen, which she wore to a meeting with Premminger in his office. The effect, and his subsequent viewing of her freer, looser appearances in the 'soundies' material, helped earn her the title role.

The remainder of the cast was completed with Harry Belafonte, Pearl Bailey, Brock Peters, Diahann Carroll, Madame Sul-Te-Wan (uncredited), Olga James, and Joe Adams.

Despite Dandridge's recognition as a singer, the studio wanted an operatic voice, so Dandridge's voice was dubbed by white mezzo-soprano Marilyn Horne. Carmen Jones opened to favorable reviews and strong box-office returns on October 28, 1954, earning $70,000 during its first week and $50,000 during its second. Dandridge's performance as the seductive Carmen made her one of Hollywood's first African-American sex symbols and earned her positive reviews. On November 1, 1954, Dorothy Dandridge became the first black woman featured on the cover of Life. Walter Winchell described her performance as "bewitching", and Variety said that it "maintains the right hedonistic note throughout".

Carmen Jones became a worldwide success, eventually earning over $10 million at the box office and becoming one of the year's highest-earning films. Dandridge was nominated for an Academy Award for Best Actress, becoming the first African American nominated for a leading role. At the 27th Academy Awards held on March 30, 1955, Dandridge was a nominee along with Grace Kelly, Audrey Hepburn, Judy Garland, and Jane Wyman. Although Kelly won the award for her performance in The Country Girl, Dandridge became an overnight sensation. At the 1955 Oscar ceremony, Dandridge presented the Academy Award for Film Editing to On the Waterfront editor Gene Milford.

On February 15, 1955, Dandridge signed a three-movie deal with 20th Century Fox starting at $75,000 a film. Darryl F. Zanuck, the studio head, had personally suggested the studio sign Dandridge to a contract. Zanuck had big plans for her, hoping she would become the first African-American screen icon. He purchased the film rights to The Blue Angel, and intended to cast her as saloon singer Lola-Lola in an all-black remake of the original 1930 film. She was also scheduled to star as Cigarette in a remake of Under Two Flags. Meanwhile, Dandridge agreed to play the role of Tuptim in a film version of The King and I and a sultry upstairs neighbor in The Lieutenant Wore Skirts. However, her former director and now-lover Otto Preminger, suggested she accept only leading roles. As an international star, Dorothy Dandridge rejected the two lesser roles and they were eventually given to Rita Moreno, a Puerto Rican actress.

On April 11, 1955, Dandridge became the first black performer to open at the Empire Room at New York's Waldorf-Astoria hotel. Her success as a headliner led to the hotel booking other black performers, such as the Count Basie Orchestra with vocalist Joe Williams, Pearl Bailey, and Lena Horne.

Hollywood Research, Inc. trial 
In 1957, Dandridge sued Confidential for libel over its article that described a scandalous incident, proved fictitious, that it claimed occurred in 1950. In May 1957, she accepted an out-of-court settlement of $10,000. 

Dandridge was one of two Hollywood stars who testified at the 1957 criminal libel trial of Hollywood Research, Inc., the company that published Confidential and other tabloid magazines from that era. Four months after her out-of-court settlement for $10,000, she and actress Maureen O'Hara, the only other star who testified at the criminal trial, were photographed shaking hands outside the downtown-Los Angeles courtroom where the highly publicized trial was held. Testimony from O'Hara, as well as from a disgruntled former magazine editor named Howard Rushmore, revealed that the magazines published false information provided by hotel maids, clerks, and movie-theater ushers who were paid for their tips. The stories with questionable veracity most often centered around alleged incidents of casual sex. When the jury and press visited Grauman's Chinese Theatre to determine whether O'Hara could have performed various sexual acts while seated in the balcony, as reported by a magazine published by Hollywood Research, Inc., this was discovered to have been impossible.

Dandridge had not testified during her civil lawsuit earlier in 1957, but in September she gave testimony in the criminal trial that further strengthened the prosecution's case. Alleged by Confidential to have fornicated with a white bandleader in the woods of Lake Tahoe, Nevada in 1950, she testified that racial segregation had confined her to her hotel during her nightclub engagement in Lake Tahoe. When she was not in the hotel lounge rehearsing or performing her singing, according to her testimony, she was required to stay inside her room where she slept alone. Dandridge's testimony, along with that of O'Hara, proved beyond any doubt that Hollywood Research had committed libel at least twice. The judge ordered Hollywood Research to stop publishing questionable stories based on paid tips. This curtailed invasive tabloid journalism until 1971, when Generoso Pope, Jr. moved the National Enquirer, which he owned, from New York to Lantana, Florida, where there were fewer restrictions.

Later career 

In 1957, after a three-year absence from film acting, Dandridge agreed to appear in the film Island in the Sun opposite an ensemble cast, including James Mason, Harry Belafonte, Joan Fontaine, Joan Collins, and Stephen Boyd. Dandridge portrayed a local West Indian shop clerk who has an interracial love affair with a white man, played by John Justin. The film was controversial for its time period, and the script was revised numerous times to accommodate the Motion Picture Production Code requirements about interracial relationships. Dandridge and Justin did have an extremely intimate, loving embrace that succeeded in not breaching the code. Despite the behind-the-scenes controversy, the film received favorable reviews and was one of the year's biggest successes.

Dandridge next agreed to star opposite German actor Curd Jürgens in the French/Italian production of Tamango (1958). A reluctant Dandridge had agreed to appear in the film only after learning that it focused on a nineteenth-century slave revolt on a cargo ship traveling from Africa to Cuba. However, she nearly withdrew when the initial script called for her to swim in the nude and spend the majority of the film in a two-piece bathing suit made of rags. When Dandridge threatened to leave the film, the script and her wardrobe were retooled to her liking. As United States Production code requirements did not apply to the Italian film production, a passionate kiss between Jürgens and Dandridge's characters was permitted in the shooting of Tamango. This was Dandridge's first, and only, on-screen kiss with a white actor. Tamango was withheld from American release until late 1959. It received mixed reviews from critics and achieved only minor success.

In MGM's The Decks Ran Red (1958), Dandridge co-starred with James Mason, Broderick Crawford, and Stuart Whitman as Mahia, a cook's wife aboard a tired World War II surplus freighter enduring a mutiny. Despite being universally panned, the film generated a respectable audience. During production, fellow actor Stuart Whitman said that he noted her strength as she was going through personal turmoil.

In late 1958, Dandridge accepted producer Samuel Goldwyn's offer to star alongside Sidney Poitier in Goldwyn's forthcoming production of Porgy and Bess. This was her first major Hollywood film in five years. Her acceptance angered the black community, who felt the story's negative stereotyping of blacks was degrading. When the initial director, Rouben Mamoulian, was replaced with Otto Preminger, he informed Dandridge that her performance was not credible, and that she needed intensive coaching to handle such a role. Porgy and Bess had a long and costly production. All the sets and costumes were destroyed in a fire and had to be replaced, which amounted to a loss of almost $2 million. Continuous script rewrites and other problems prolonged the production and ultimately pushed the film over its original budget. When it was released in June 1959, it drew mixed reviews and failed financially.

In 1959, Dandridge starred in a low-budget British thriller, Malaga, in which she played a European woman with an Italian name. The film, co-starring Trevor Howard and Edmund Purdom, plotted a jewel robbery and its aftermath. Some pre-release publicity invited the belief that Dandridge received her first, and only, on-screen kiss with a white actor (Howard) in this film. She had kissed her white costar in Tamango, but Dandridge and Howard, under László Benedek's direction, created some strongly understated sexual tension. The film was withheld from a theatrical release abroad until 1960, and was not released until 1962 in the United States. Malaga was her final completed film appearance.

In 1962, Dandridge was filmed with Alain Delon on the set of La Fabuleuse Aventure de Marco Polo, a Raoul Lévy-produced French-Italian film that was abandoned due to financial issues. Years later it was released as Marco the Magnificent without either Dandridge or Delon..  She also appeared as Anita in a Highland Park Music Theater production of West Side Story, but she lasted only two performances due to illness.On 31 March 1962, Dandridge sang in the Le Paon Rouge nightclub of the Phoenicia Intercontinental as the guest of honour.

By 1963, Dandridge's popularity had dwindled, and she was performing in nightclubs to pay off debts from numerous lawsuits. She filed for bankruptcy and went into seclusion before appearing as a lounge act in Las Vegas in 1964. In 1965, she attempted to revive her acting career. Dandridge signed a new contract in Mexico and was scheduled to appear as the female lead in a film about outlaw Johnny Ringo.

Personal life 
Dandridge was a Democrat, and she supported the campaign of Adlai Stevenson during the 1952 presidential election.

Having developed an interest in activism because of the racism she encountered in the industry, Dandridge became involved with the National Urban League and the National Association for the Advancement of Colored People.

Marriages and relationships 
During an engagement at the Cotton Club, Dandridge met Harold Nicholas, a dancer and entertainer. They married at a Hollywood ceremony on September 6, 1942. Guests at their wedding included Oscar-winner Hattie McDaniel, jazz singer Etta Jones, and choreographer Nick Castle. They had an unhappy marriage, which deteriorated because of Nicholas' womanizing and inattentiveness. By 1948, Nicholas had abandoned his family. Dandridge filed for divorce in September 1950, and it was finalized in October 1951.

Dandridge had given birth to her only child, Harolyn Suzanne Nicholas, on September 2, 1943. While she was in labor, Nicholas left her stranded at her sister-in-law's home without the car when he went to have sex with her best friend. At first, Dandridge refused to go to the hospital without him. Harolyn's delayed birth required the use of forceps. This may have resulted in the brain damage that left her requiring lifelong constant care. Dandridge blamed herself for her daughter's condition, and for not getting to the hospital sooner. Harolyn was unable to speak and never recognized Dandridge as her mother. Dandridge was private about her daughter's condition; she didn't publicly speak about it until a 1963 appearance on The Mike Douglas Show.

While filming Carmen Jones (1954), she began an affair with director Otto Preminger that lasted four years, during which Preminger advised her on career matters. He demanded that she accept only starring roles after her success in his film. Dandridge later regretted following his advice. She became pregnant by him in 1955, but was forced to have an abortion by the studio. She ended the affair when she realized that Preminger had no plans to leave his wife to marry her. Their affair was depicted in the HBO Films biopic Introducing Dorothy Dandridge, in which Preminger was portrayed by Austrian actor Klaus Maria Brandauer.

Dandridge married Jack Denison on June 22, 1959. They divorced in 1962, amid financial setbacks and allegations of domestic violence. Dandridge discovered that the people who were handling her finances had swindled her out of $150,000, and she owed $139,000 in back taxes. She was forced to sell her Hollywood home and place her daughter in a California state mental institution, Camarillo State Hospital. Dandridge moved into a small apartment on Fountain Avenue in West Hollywood, California.

Death 

On September 8, 1965, Dandridge spoke by telephone from Los Angeles with friend and former sister-in-law Geraldine "Geri" Branton. Dandridge was scheduled to fly to New York the next day to prepare for her nightclub engagement at Basin Street East. Branton told biographers that during the long conversation, Dandridge veered from expressing hope for the future, to singing Barbra Streisand's "People" in its entirety, to making this cryptic remark moments before hanging up on her: "Whatever happens, I know you will understand." Several hours later, Dandridge was found naked and unresponsive in her apartment by her manager, Earl Mills. A Los Angeles pathology institute determined that the cause of death was an accidental overdose of the antidepressant imipramine. The Los Angeles County Coroner's Office concluded that she died of a fat embolism resulting from a right foot fracture sustained five days previously.

On September 12, 1965, a private funeral service was held at the Little Chapel of the Flowers; Dandridge was cremated and her ashes interred in the Freedom Mausoleum at Forest Lawn Memorial Park.

Legacy 
In the 1980s, after the passing of the blaxploitation era, such stars as Cicely Tyson, Jada Pinkett Smith, Halle Berry, Janet Jackson, Whitney Houston, Kimberly Elise, Loretta Devine, Tasha Smith, and Angela Bassett began to acknowledge Dandridge's contribution to the image of African Americans in American motion pictures.

In the movie To Wong Foo, Thanks for Everything! Julie Newmar (1995), Wesley Snipes played Noxeema Jackson, a drag queen whose dream is to play Dorothy Dandridge in a movie about her life and work.

In 1999, Halle Berry produced and starred in the HBO movie Introducing Dorothy Dandridge, for which she won the Primetime Emmy Award, Golden Globe Award, and Screen Actors Guild Award. When Berry won the Academy Award for Best Actress for her role in Monster's Ball, she dedicated the "moment [to] Dorothy Dandridge, Lena Horne, Diahann Carroll." Both Dandridge and Berry were from Cleveland, Ohio, and were born in the same hospital.

Dandridge was posthumously awarded a star on the Hollywood Walk of Fame in January 1984. She is featured as the most prominent figure in a mural on an exterior wall of Hollywood High School. A statue of Dandridge, designed by Catherine Hardwicke, honors multi-ethnic leading ladies of the cinema, including Mae West, Dolores del Río, and Anna May Wong.

Recording artist Janelle Monáe performs a song entitled "Dorothy Dandridge Eyes" on her 2013 album The Electric Lady, with Esperanza Spalding. In the 1969 movie The Lost Man, a character Dorothy Starr (played by Beverly Todd) says that she named herself after Dandridge.

In the February 2016 episode of Black-ish, "Sink or Swim," Beyoncé is referred to as the Dorothy Dandridge of her time, citing the star power Dandridge wielded in her day.

In 2020, Laura Harrier portrayed Camille Washington in the Netflix miniseries Hollywood. She is an up-and-coming actress during the Hollywood Golden Age in the post-World War II era, a character largely inspired by and based on Dandridge.

Discography 
Dandridge first gained fame as a solo artist from her performances in nightclubs, usually accompanied by Phil Moore on piano. Although she was known for her renditions of songs such as "Blow Out the Candle", "You Do Something to Me", and "Talk Sweet Talk To Me", she recorded very little on vinyl. It is unknown whether her lack of recording was due to personal choice or lack of opportunity.

As part of the Dandridge Sisters singing group

As a solo artist 

In 1958, she recorded a full-length album for Verve Records featuring Oscar Peterson with Herb Ellis, Ray Brown, and Alvin Stoller (Catalogue #314 547-514 2) that remained unreleased in the vaults until a CD release in 1999. This CD also included four tracks from 1961 (with an unknown orchestra) that included one 45 rpm record single and another aborted single:

The tracks "It's a Beautiful Evening" and "Smooth Operator" were aborted for release as a single and remained in the Verve vaults until the Smooth Operator release in 1999. These are the only known songs Dandridge recorded on vinyl. Several songs she sang, including her version of "Cow-Cow Boogie" were recorded on soundies and are not included on this list.

Filmography

As an actress

As herself 
 Cavalcade of Stars (1952; 1 episode)
 Songs for Sale (1952; 1 episode)
 The Colgate Comedy Hour (1951–1953; 2 episodes)
 The George Jessel Show (1954; 1 episode)
 Light's Diamond Jubilee (1954) TV special broadcast on all four TV networks
 The 27th Annual Academy Awards (1955; TV special; Nominee & Presenter)
 Val Parnell's Sunday Night at the London Palladium (1956; 1 episode)
 Ford Star Jubilee (1956; 1 episode)
 The 29th Annual Academy Awards (1957; TV special; Performer & Presenter)
 The Ed Sullivan Show (1952–1961; 7 episodes)
 Juxe Box Jury (1964; 1 episode)

Stage work 
 Swingin' the Dream (1939)
 Meet the People (1941)
 Jump for Joy (1941)
 Sweet 'n' Hot (1944)
 Crazy Girls (1952)
 West Side Story (1962)
 Show Boat (1964)

See also

References 
Notes

Citations

Works cited

Further reading 
 Dandridge, Dorothy & Conrad, Earl. Everything and Nothing: The Dorothy Dandridge Tragedy. Abelard-Schuman; 1st edition (1970). .  HarperCollins, New Ed edition (2000). – .
 Bogle, Donald. Dorothy Dandridge: A Biography, Amistad Press, 1997. .

External links 

 
 
 Dorothy Dandridge – A Life Unfulfilled
 Photographs and literature
 LifeStory: Honor Dorothy Dandridge's Life
 FBI file on Dorothy Dandridge

1922 births
1965 deaths
20th-century American actresses
20th Century Studios contract players
Accidental deaths in California
Actresses from Cleveland
African-American actresses
African-American women singers
American film actresses
American musical theatre actresses
American stage actresses
American television actresses
20th-century American women singers
Burials at Forest Lawn Memorial Park (Glendale)
Drug-related deaths in California
Traditional pop music singers
20th-century American singers
Nightclub performers
Verve Records artists
Decca Records artists
Columbia Records artists
MGM Records artists
American women jazz singers
American jazz singers
California Democrats
Ohio Democrats